The Kingdom of León was an independent kingdom situated in the northwest region of the Iberian Peninsula. It was founded in 910 when the Christian princes of Asturias along the northern coast of the peninsula shifted their capital from Oviedo to the city of León. The kings of León fought civil wars, wars against neighbouring kingdoms, and campaigns to repel invasions by both the Moors and the Vikings, all in order to protect their kingdom's changing fortunes.

García is the first of the kings described by the charters as reigning in León. It is generally assumed that the old Asturian kingdom was divided among the three sons of Alfonso III of Asturias: García (León), Ordoño (Galicia) and Fruela (Asturias), as all three participated in deposing their father. When García died in 914, León went to Ordoño, who now ruled both León and Galicia as Ordoño II. At Ordoño's death in 924, the throne went to his brother Fruela II (924–925), who died of leprosy a year later. Fruela's death in 925 was followed by a civil war, after which Alfonso, the eldest son of Ordoño II, emerged as the new king Alfonso IV, ruling from 925 to 932. After a further power struggle, Ramiro, the younger brother of Alfonso IV, became king in 932, having captured his brother Alfonso, as well as the three sons of Fruela II – Alfonso, Ordoño and Ramiro. Alfonso IV may have died soon after, but he left two infant sons, called Ordoño and Fruela. When Ramiro died in 951, he left two sons by two different wives. When the elder son Ordoño III, who ruled from 951 to 56, suddenly died aged little more than thirty, he was succeeded by his younger half-brother Sancho I "The Fat" (956–966), as Ordoño had failed to produce a legitimate heir.

Sancho's son Ramiro had been born in 961 and was only about five years old when his father died. He was also the only legitimate member of the direct family line. His mother Teresa Ansúrez had retired into the recently founded monastery of San Pelayo, of which her sister-in-law Elvira was the abbess. Another nun, Sancho's full sister Elvira Ramírez emerged as regent during his long minority. Under the regency of Elvira, fresh raids of the Northmen were repelled from the coast of Galicia. In 968, Gunrod of Norway, the Viking leader, established himself on Galician soil and held out for a year and a half: Bishop Sisnando of Compostela died fighting him, and his successor St Rudesind carried on the struggle until Count Gonzalo Sánchez defeated the invaders and killed Gunrod himself. Count Sánchez destroyed the entire fleet of Gunrod. In 1008, Norman Vikings attacked Galicia, destroying Santiago de Compostela and seventeen other towns, while Olaf Haraldsson of Norway raided Spain's Atlantic coast. There are also reports of a series of attacks on the Christian lands of north Spain in 1028, 1032, and 1038, and the Christian kingdoms in the north commonly used Vikings as mercenaries in their internecine wars.

The County of Castile split off in 931, the County of Portugal separated to become the independent Kingdom of Portugal in 1139 and the eastern, inland part of León was joined to the Kingdom of Castile in 1230. From 1296 to 1301, the Kingdom of León was again independent and after the re-union with Castile remained a Crown until 1833, but as part of a united Spain from 1479. In the Royal Decree of 30 November 1833, the Kingdom of León was considered one of the Spanish regions and divided into the provinces of León, Zamora and Salamanca. In 1978, these three provinces of the region of León were included along with six provinces of the historic region of Old Castile to create the autonomous community of Castile and León. However, significant parts of the former kingdom today integrate these three provinces and the autonomous communities of Extremadura, Galicia and Asturias, in Spain, in addition to northern Portugal.

Background 
The city of León was founded by the Roman Seventh Legion (usually written as Legio Septima Gemina ("twin seventh legion"). It was the headquarters of that legion in the Late Roman Empire and was a centre for trade in gold, which was mined at Las Médulas nearby. In 540, the city was conquered by the Arian Visigothic king Liuvigild, who did not harass the already well-established Roman Catholic population. In 717, León fell again, this time to the Moors. However, León was one of the first cities retaken during the Christian reconquest of the Iberian peninsula, and became part of the Kingdom of Asturias in 742.

León was a small town during this time, but one of the few former Roman cities in the Kingdom of Asturias which still held significance (the surviving Roman walls bear the medieval walling upon them). During Visigothic times, the city had served as a bishopric, and incorporating the city into Asturias brought legitimacy to the Asturian monarchs who sought to lead a unified Iberian church, during a time when most of the Iberian Peninsula was governed by Muslim powers.

History 

León was created as a separate kingdom when the Asturian king, Alfonso the Great, divided his realm among his three sons. León was inherited by García I (910–914) who moved the capital of the kingdom of Astures to León. His successor was Ordoño II of León (914–924). Ordoño II was also a military leader who brought expeditions from León south to Seville, Córdoba, and Guadalajara, in the heart of the Muslim territory.

After a few years of civil wars during the reigns of Fruela II, Alfonso Fróilaz and Alfonso IV, Ramiro II (931–951) assumed the throne and brought stability to the kingdom. A brave military commander who defeated the Muslim armies in their own territory, Ramiro's expeditions turned the valley of the Douro into a no-man's land that separated Christian kingdoms in the north of Iberia from the Muslim states in the south. Ramiro II was nicknamed "The Devil" by Muslims because of his great military skill.

As the Leonese troops advanced they were followed by a process of repoblación, which consisted of repopulating the Meseta high plains, with people coming from Galicia and especially from Asturias and León. This migration of Asturian and Leonese peoples greatly influenced the Leonese language. During the repoblación period, there arose a distinct form of art known as Mozarabic art. Mozarabic art is a mixing of Visigoth, Islamic, and Byzantine elements. Notable examples of the Mozarabic style are the Leonese churches of San Miguel de Escalada and Santiago de Peñalba.

During the early 10th century, León expanded to the south and east, securing territory that became the County of Burgos. Fortified with numerous castles, Burgos remained within Leon until the 930s, at which time Count Ferdinand II of Castile began a campaign to expand Burgos and make it independent and hereditary. He took for himself the title Count of Castile, in reference to the many castles of the territory (around Burgos), and continued expanding his area at the expense of León by allying with the Caliphate of Córdoba, until 966, when he was defeated by Sancho I of León.

Viking raids 
Sancho I died towards the end of 966 and five year old Ramiro III (966–982) ascended to the throne of León. In the second year of his reign, 968, a Viking fleet of 100 ships landed in Galicia led by king Gunrod. The Vikings defeated the Galician forces, and killed Sisnando, the bishop of Compostela. The defeat in the Battle of Fornelos left Galicia without an authority capable of facing the Vikings, who for three years camped comfortably, looting different Galician regions. In 971, Gunrod and his Vikings were surprised and defeated by Count Gonzalo Sánchez upon return towards Ría de Ferrol (where they had their stranded ships). The Galician troops captured Gunrod and many of his warriors, executing them all. Sporadic Viking assaults continued in the north of Spain even into the 11th century. In 1008, Galicia and the Douro region were attacked, and in 1014 or 1015 a major raid was launched against the city of Tui at the mouth of the Minho River. The Vikings managed to successfully capture the bishop and many of the town's inhabitants. The Knýtlinga saga and Gesta Danorum describe another big raid after this one, in the year 1028. It was led by Ulv Galiciefarer, who tried to go to the Riá de Arousa area and then became a mercenary for Rodrigo Romániz, but was defeated by the bishop of Compostela. The last recorded raids occurred during the period 1047–1066 when Cresconius, the bishop of Compostela, fought and won several battles against the Vikings.

Peak 

The Kingdom of León continued to be the most important of all those of the Iberian Peninsula. However, Sancho III of Navarre (1004–1035) took over Castile in the 1020s, and managed León in the last year of his life, leaving Galicia to temporary independence. In the division of lands which followed his death, his son Fernando succeeded to the county of Castile. Two years later, in 1037, he defeated the king of León who died in the battle and, because Fernando was married to the Leonese king's sister, he became king of León and Galicia. For nearly 30 years, until his death in 1065, he ruled over the kingdom of León and the county of Castile as Ferdinand I of León.

Early in its existence, León lay directly to the north of the powerful Caliphate of Córdoba. When internal dissensions divided Al-Andalus' loyalties in the 11th century, leading to the age of smaller Taifa successor states of the Caliphate, the Christian kingdoms, who had been sending tribute to the Caliphate, found themselves in a position to demand payments (parias) instead, in return for favours to particular factions or as simple extortion.

Thus, though scarcely influenced by the culture of the successor territories of the former Caliphate, Ferdinand I followed the example of the counts of Barcelona and the kings of Aragon and became hugely wealthy from the parias of the Taifas. When he died in 1065, his territories and the parias were split among his three sons, of whom Alfonso emerged the victor in the classic fratricidal strife common to feudal successions.

Few in Europe would have known of this immense new wealth in a kingdom so isolated that its bishops had virtually no contact with Rome, except that Ferdinand and his heirs (the kings of León and Castile) became the greatest benefactors of the Abbey of Cluny, where Abbot Hugh (died 1109) undertook construction of the huge third abbey church, the cynosure of every eye. The Way of Saint James called pilgrims from Western Europe to the supposed tomb of Saint James the Great in Santiago de Compostela, and the large hostels and churches along the route encouraged building in the Romanesque style.

Alfonso VI was one of the most important kings of León of the Middle Ages. He assumed control of first León, and later Castile and Galicia, when his brother died attacking the Leonese city of Zamora. He was crowned Emperor of Spain over all the kings of the Iberian Peninsula.

León and Castile 

The taking of Toledo, the old Visigoth capital, in 1085 by Alfonso VI of León was a turning point in the development of León and Castile and the first major milestone in the Reconquista. Christian Mozarabs from Al-Andalus had come north to populate the deserted frontier lands, and the traditional view of Spanish history has been that they brought with them the remains of Visigothic and Classical culture, and a new ideology of Reconquista, a crusade against the Moors. Modern historians see the fall of Toledo as marking a basic change in relations with the Moorish south, turning from the simple extortion of annual tribute to outright territorial expansion. Alfonso VI was drawn into local politics by strife within Toledo and inherited the political alliances of the city-state. He found himself faced with problems unfamiliar to him, such as appointing and dealing with a Catholic bishop in Toledo and the settling of garrisons in the small Muslim strongholds, the taifas, which were dependent on Toledo and which often bought the king's favour with gold from their trade with Al-Andalus and the Maghreb. Alfonso VI thus found his role as a Catholic king redefined as he governed large cities with sophisticated urban, Muslim subjects and growing Christian populations.

The two kingdoms of León and Castile were split in 1157, when a major defeat for Alfonso VII of Castile weakened the authority of Castile.

The last two kings of an independent Kingdom of León (1157–1230) were Ferdinand II and Alfonso IX. Fernando II led León's conquest of Mérida, a city dating from Roman times. Alfonso IX, besides conquering the whole of Extremadura (including the cities of Cáceres and Badajoz), was the most modern king of his time, founding the University of Salamanca in 1212 and summoning in 1188 the first parliament with representation of the citizenry ever seen in Europe, the Cortes of León.

Alfonso IX did not want his kingdom to disappear upon his death and designated his heirs as Sancha and Dulce, the daughters of his first wife. In order to maintain the independence of the Kingdom of León, Afonso IX applied in his testament the Galician right of inheritance, which granted men and women equality in succession, thus leaving his daughters to be the future queens of León. However, when Alfonso IX died in 1230, his son by Berenguela of Castile, Ferdinand III of Castile, invaded León and assumed the crown. He thus became the first joint sovereign of both kingdoms since the death of Alfonso VII in 1157. The isolated Atlantic province, the County of Portugal, had won independence in 1139 to become the Kingdom of Portugal.

The union between León and Castile was not accepted by the Leonese people.  King Ferdinand III needed two years to suppress the secessionist revolts in the Kingdom of León, so his son Alfonso X restored the independence of the Kingdom of León. However, this was not respected by his son and successor, Sancho IV, whose brother John waited until 1296, following Sancho's death the previous year, to be crowned as John I, King of León, Galicia and Seville. In 1301, he abdicated, and the king of Castile assumed the Crown of León, reuniting the two kingdoms.

Though the kings of Castile and León initially continued to take the title King of León as the superior title, and to use a lion as part of their standard, power in fact became centralized in Castile, as exemplified by the Leonese language's replacement by Castilian. The Kingdom of León and the Kingdom of Castile kept different Parliaments, different flags, different coin and different laws until the Modern Era, when Spain, like other European states, centralized governmental power.

Modern era
The Kingdom of León coexisted as a personal union under the Crown of Castile, with León possessing separate institutions, such as its own cortes, the Real Adelantamiento of the Kingdom of León, and the Merino mayor of León, among others, many of which lasted until the 19th century. The Castilian monarchs, however, soon began a process of unifying the laws of the two kingdoms, as exemplified by the Siete Partidas. By the 16th century, León became a captaincy-general.

19th century 
In the 19th century, León declared war, together with Galicia and Asturias, against France, and organised the Junta General del Reino de León as its own government. The modern region of León was established in 1833 and was divided into León, Zamora, and Salamanca provinces.

Present 

At present, León is composed of the provinces of León, Zamora, and Salamanca, and is now part of the autonomous community of Castile and León within the modern Kingdom of Spain.

Political parties representing Leonesism, the Leonese regionalist and nationalist movements, support the creation of an autonomous community separate from Castile. Leonesist parties gained 13.6% of votes cast in the León autonomic elections in 2007. There have also been initiatives approved by some Leonese city councils to establish a NUTS-2 (European Statistical Region) for León.

See also
León (historical region)
List of Leonese monarchs
Leonese language
Heraldry of León
Al-Andalus
History of Portugal
History of Spain
Kingdom of Asturias
Kingdom of Castile
Kingdom of Galicia
Nuevo León

Notes

References

External links
"History of the Kingdom of León"
R.A. Fletcher, The Episcopate in the Kingdom of León in the Twelfth Century (Chapter 1): Gives the cultural context of earlier and 12th century León
"A brief explanation about the modern Leonese Country regionalism"

 
Kingdom of Castile
Medieval Spain
Leon
Leon
Leon
Leon
History of Portugal by polity
10th century in Spain
11th century in the Kingdom of León
12th century in the Kingdom of León
13th century in the Kingdom of León
States and territories established in the 910s
States and territories disestablished in 1230
910 establishments
1301 disestablishments in Europe
1230s disestablishments in Europe
10th-century establishments in Spain
13th-century disestablishments in Spain
Reconquista
Former countries in Europe
10th-century establishments in Europe